Essa Saleh Abuainain (born ) is a Qatari male weightlifter, competing in the 77 kg category and representing Qatar at international competitions. He participated at the 2014 Asian Games in the 77 kg event.

Major competitions

See also
 Weightlifting at the 2014 Asian Games – Men's 77 kg

References

External links 
 Kuwait’s Mezayen lands first gold for region
 IWF.net 
 Qatar open basketball campaign with victory
 Asian Games: Qatar's lite lifters set records

1984 births
Living people
Qatari male weightlifters
Place of birth missing (living people)
Weightlifters at the 2014 Asian Games
Asian Games competitors for Qatar